Puente Artesanal is a bridge and sign denoting the entrance to Tlaquepaque, in the Mexican state of Jalisco.

The structure was completed in 1978.

References

1978 establishments in Mexico
Bridges completed in 1978
Bridges in Mexico
Buildings and structures in Jalisco
Tlaquepaque